Ressons-sur-Matz is a commune in the Oise department in northern France.

See also
Communes of the Oise department
The works of Maxime Real del Sarte

References

Communes of Oise